Chandpur may refer to:

Bangladesh
 Chandpur District, a district in Chittagong Division, Bangladesh
 Chandpur Sadar Upazila 
 Chandpur, Bangladesh, a city and district headquarters
 Chandpur, a model village in Senbagh Upazila, Noakhali District, Bangladesh

India
 Chandpur, Bhopal, a village in Madhya Pradesh
 Chandpur, Bijnor, a town in Uttar Pradesh
 Chandpur (Assembly constituency), a constituency of the Uttar Pradesh Legislative Assembly
 Chandpur, Ghola, a census town in North 24 Parganas district, West Bengal
 Chandpur, Hailakandi, a village in Assam
 Chandpur, Mandirbazar, a census town in South 24 Parganas district, West Bengal
 Chandpur, Malda, a gram panchayat and village in West Bengal
 Chandpur, Rajasthan, a village in Mundawar tehsil, Alwar district

See also
 Chandpuri
 Chandipur (disambiguation)
 Chandrapur (disambiguation)